Cirque Lake Peak, at  above sea level is a peak in the Sawtooth Range of Idaho. The peak is located in the Sawtooth Wilderness of Sawtooth National Recreation Area in Boise County.

References 

Mountains of Boise County, Idaho
Mountains of Idaho
Glacial lakes of the Sawtooth Wilderness